Plectrocerum spinicorne is a species of beetle in the family Cerambycidae. It was described by Olivier in 1795.

References

Heteropsini
Beetles described in 1795